Cabagra is an indigenous territory in Costa Rica. It is located in Buenos Aires a province of Puntarenas and borders with the indigenous territory of Salitre .

References 

Indigenous territories of Costa Rica